Sunny Hills Performing Arts Center is a performing arts hall in Fullerton, California. It has a capacity for 360 people and regularly hosts concerts and is a venue for Sunny Hills High School. It is a notable venue for classical concerts in Orange County.
Fullerton Friends of Music, the oldest chamber music society in Orange County, perform five concerts a year at the venue.

References

Concert halls in California
Buildings and structures in Fullerton, California
Culture of Fullerton, California
Tourist attractions in Fullerton, California